Susan Akland is an American politician and member of the Minnesota House of Representatives. A Republican, she was elected in 2020 and represents District 19A in south-central Minnesota, which encompasses the whole of Nicollet County, as well as small portions of Le Sueur and Blue Earth counties, and includes the city of St. Peter and North Mankato.

Political career 
Akland was first elected in 2020, defeating DFL incumbent Jeff Brand.

Akland received criticism in 2021, when she was one of many Republican legislators to appear and speak at a self-styled "Storm the Capitol" rally outside of the Minnesota State Capitol in Saint Paul on January 6, which ran concurrent to and endorsed the 2021 United States Capitol attack. She defended herself against calls from the former Representative Brand to step down, claiming that she had been invited to the event by colleague Glenn Gruenhagen and did not know of its nature beforehand. She would later vote to pass a resolution in the House that specifically condemned the Capitol attack in Washington, D.C. and affirmed the results of the 2020 election.

A former healthcare worker, Akland has been supportive of the wearing of masks during the COVID-19 pandemic.

Personal life 
Akland is a Christian. She is married to Mark Akland, a physician at the St. Peter Mayo clinic. They have one son, John, and two grandchildren.

References

External links 

 Susan Akland's campaign website

Living people
Republican Party members of the Minnesota House of Representatives
21st-century American politicians
21st-century American women politicians
Women state legislators in Minnesota
Year of birth missing (living people)